Akif Erdemgil (1876; Debre-i Bala (Debar) - March 22, 1962) was an officer of the Ottoman Army and a general of the Turkish Army.

See also
List of high-ranking commanders of the Turkish War of Independence

Sources

External links

1876 births
1962 deaths
People from Debar
Macedonian Turks
Republican People's Party (Turkey) politicians
Deputies of Sivas
Ottoman Army officers
Turkish Army generals
Ottoman military personnel of the Greco-Turkish War (1897)
Ottoman military personnel of the Balkan Wars
Ottoman military personnel of World War I
Turkish military personnel of the Franco-Turkish War
Turkish military personnel of the Greco-Turkish War (1919–1922)
Ottoman Military Academy alumni
Recipients of the Iron Cross (1914), 1st class
Recipients of the Medal of Independence with Red Ribbon (Turkey)